Gregory Duane Feasel (born November 7, 1958) is an American professional sports figure. He played in the United States Football League (USFL) and National Football League (NFL) as an offensive tackle during the 1980s, and is currently the president and chief operating officer for the Colorado Rockies of Major League Baseball (MLB).

Biography
Born and raised in Barstow, California, Feasel graduated from Barstow High School, and initially attended Barstow Junior College. He transferred to Abilene Christian University (ACU) in Texas and he was later inducted as a member of the ACU Hall of Fame. His younger brother Grant (1960–2012) also played at ACU and in the National Football League (NFL).

Unselected in the 1980 NFL Draft, Feasel failed to make an NFL team in his first three attempts. He played in the United States Football League (USFL) with the Denver Gold from 1983 to 1985, then in the NFL for the Green Bay Packers in 1986 and the San Diego Chargers in 1987.

Feasel joined the Colorado Rockies organization in 1996 and became chief operating officer in 2012. In April 2021, he was named team president, a position that had been vacant since the 2010 death of the prior president, Keli McGregor.

Feasel and his wife, Lynn, have a daughter.

See also

List of Green Bay Packers players

References

External links
 

1958 births
Living people
People from Barstow, California
Sportspeople from San Bernardino County, California
American football offensive tackles
Abilene Christian Wildcats football players
Denver Gold players
Green Bay Packers players
San Diego Chargers players
Colorado Rockies executives